Ethmia ampanella is a moth in the family Depressariidae. It is found on the Comoros.

References

Moths described in 1976
ampanella